Peggy Ann Lautenschlager (November 22, 1955 – March 31, 2018) was an American attorney and Democratic politician who was the first chair of the Wisconsin Ethics Commission from 2016 to 2017, the 42nd Attorney General of Wisconsin from 2003 to 2007, the United States Attorney for the Western District of Wisconsin from 1993 to 2001, a member of the Wisconsin State Assembly for the 52nd district from 1989 to 1993, and the Winnebago County District Attorney from 1985 to 1989. Lautenschlager was the first woman to serve as Attorney General of Wisconsin.

Lautenschlager's son, Josh Kaul, is the current Wisconsin Attorney General. He was elected in the general election of November 6, 2018.

Early life and career
Lautenschlager was born in Fond du Lac, Wisconsin, to Milton Adam "Fritz" Lautenschlager (1926–2012), a sports coach, and Patsy Ruth "Pat" (née Oleson). She graduated from Goodrich High School (now Fond du Lac High School) in 1973 as valedictorian of her class. Lautenschlager was a Phi Beta Kappa and summa cum laude graduate of Lake Forest College, in 1977, majoring in history and mathematics. She graduated from the University of Wisconsin Law School in June 1980.

Public service
After graduation from law school, Lautenschlager was an attorney in private practice in Oshkosh, Wisconsin, specializing in family and domestic abuse law. She served as a member of the adjunct faculties of the University of Wisconsin Law School, the University of Wisconsin–Oshkosh, and Ripon College, and served as interim circuit court commissioner of Winnebago County.

Lautenschlager was an unsuccessful candidate for election to the Wisconsin State Senate in November 1984, losing the race to incumbent Scott McCallum. Shortly after her defeat, she was appointed by Gov. Tony Earl to serve as District Attorney for Winnebago County, becoming the first woman to hold the office. She served as district attorney from July 1985 to December 1988. Lautenschlager simultaneously served on the Wisconsin State Elections Board, the Governor's Council on Domestic Abuse, the Democratic National Committee and the Oshkosh Rape Crisis Center.

Lautenschlager was elected to the Wisconsin State Assembly in 1988, unseating a 32-year Republican incumbent. She served from 1989 to 1993 representing the Fond du Lac area. She chaired the Assembly Select Committee on Drug Enforcement, Education, and Treatment and Subcommittee on Corrections Systems Concerns. She also served on the Committees on Criminal Justice, Elections and Constitutional Law, Environmental Resources, Utilities and Mining, Natural Resources, Judiciary, and Education. She served as Vice-chair of Legislative Counsel Committees on Drug Enforcement and Review of Sexual Assault Laws. She decided not to seek re-election in 1992, and instead campaigned for the congressional seat held by incumbent U.S. Rep. Tom Petri. She narrowly lost in what was an unexpectedly close race.

U.S. Attorney for the Western District of Wisconsin
In 1993, President Bill Clinton appointed Lautenschlager the United States Attorney for the Western District of Wisconsin, a position for which she was confirmed by the U.S. Senate and held until April 2001. In that capacity, she was the chief federal law enforcement officer for the state's westernmost 44 counties. In 1996, Lautenschlager was appointed by Janet Reno to serve on the 15-member Attorney General's Advisory Committee. She was the first Wisconsinite ever selected to serve on the committee.

Attorney General of Wisconsin
She was elected in 2002 as a Democrat to the office of Attorney General, succeeding Jim Doyle who successfully ran for governor.  Her campaign raised more money than any previous Democratic campaign for that office. She defeated Vince Biskupic, the Republican candidate, 52% to 48%, despite being outspent by about $200,000. During this period she was a practicing lawyer and a part-time politics professor at Ripon College, in addition to serving as Chair of the Wisconsin Ethics Commission.

Drunk-driving conviction and other controversy
In February 2004, Lautenschlager pleaded guilty to drunk driving in Dodge County, about an hour away from Madison.  The police report stated that she refused a blood test. Lautenschlager said that she had fallen asleep at the wheel, and had consumed only two glasses of wine earlier that evening. Lautenschlager reimbursed some of the costs and paid a fine of $784. Her driver's license was also revoked for a year.

Also in 2004, a state Ethics Board investigated Lautenschlager's use of her state car, ruling that her personal use of it exceeded state-allowed limits but finding "no corrupt motive or intention to obtain a dishonest advantage".

Re-election campaign
In 2006, Lautenschlager faced a Democratic challenger, Dane County Executive Kathleen Falk, a 2002 candidate for Governor and former Assistant Attorney General. Lautenschlager lost the Democratic nomination to Falk. Falk later lost the general election to former Western District of Wisconsin U.S. Attorney J. B. Van Hollen. Lautenschlager became the first incumbent Wisconsin Attorney General to lose a primary in 58 years.

Death
First diagnosed with breast cancer in 2004, Lautenschlager died on March 31, 2018, at her home in Fond du Lac, aged 62.

Electoral history
1992 Race for U.S. House of Representatives – 6th District
Tom Petri (Republican) (incumbent), 53%
Peg Lautenschlager (Democrat), 47%
2002 Race for Attorney General
Peg Lautenschlager (Democrat), 52%
Vince Biskupic (Republican), 48%
2006 Race for Attorney General – Democratic Primary
Kathleen Falk (Democrat), 53%
Peg Lautenschlager (Democrat) (incumbent), 47%

References

External links

1955 births
2018 deaths
Wisconsin Attorneys General
District attorneys in Wisconsin
Democratic Party members of the Wisconsin State Assembly
American prosecutors
Politicians from Fond du Lac, Wisconsin
Women state legislators in Wisconsin
University of Wisconsin Law School alumni
Lake Forest College alumni
United States Attorneys for the Western District of Wisconsin
Deaths from cancer in Wisconsin
Deaths from breast cancer
21st-century American women